Madonna del Sasso is a comune (municipality) in the Province of Verbano-Cusio-Ossola in the Italian region of Piedmont, located about  northeast of Turin and about  southwest of Verbania, just to the west of Lake Orta. The municipal seat is in the frazione of Boleto.

It borders the following municipalities: Arola,  Cellio con Breia, Cesara, Civiasco, Pella, Pogno, San Maurizio d'Opaglio, Valduggia, Varallo Sesia.

References

Cities and towns in Piedmont